Brickellia magnifica is a Mexican species of flowering plants in the family Asteraceae. It is native to western Mexico in the states of Nayarit and Jalisco.

Brickellia magnifica is a branching shrub up to 250 cm (100 inches) tall. The plant produces several small flower heads with yellow or purple disc florets but no ray florets.

References

magnifica
Flora of Mexico
Plants described in 1972